Glen Acres is a community on Vashon Island located about two miles north of the town of Vashon.

History
There was a post office at Glen Acres in 1917.  The area was previously known as "Vermontville" and "Aquarium".  The post office changed its name to "Glen Acres" in 1914.  There was a dock at Glen Acres which was served in 1916 by the steamer Daily.

Notes

References
 Landes, Henry, Washington Geological Survey, A geographic dictionary of Washington Lanborn Public Printers, Olympia, WA (1917) (accessed 05-31-11)
 Vashonhistory.com Vashon Timeline (accessed 05-31-11)

Populated places on Puget Sound
Landforms of Puget Sound